This is a list of places on the Victorian Heritage Register in the City of Darebin in Victoria, Australia. The Victorian Heritage Register is maintained by the Heritage Council of Victoria.

The Victorian Heritage Register, as of 2020, lists the following nine state-registered places within the City of Darebin:

References

Darebin
City of Darebin